The 2017–18 Temple Owls basketball team represented Temple University during the 2017–18 NCAA Division I men's basketball season. The Owls, led by 12th-year head coach Fran Dunphy, played their home games at the Liacouras Center in Philadelphia, Pennsylvania as members the American Athletic Conference. They finished the season 17–16, 8–10 in AAC play to finish in seventh place. In the AAC tournament, they defeated Tulane before losing to Wichita State in the quarterfinals. They received a bid to the National Invitation Tournament where they lost to Penn State in the first round.

Previous season 
The Owls finished the 2016–17 season 16–16, 7–11 in AAC play to finish in eighth place. They lost in the first round of the AAC tournament to East Carolina.

Offseason

Departures

2017 recruiting class

2018 recruiting class

Roster

Schedule and results

|-
!colspan=12 style=| Exhibition

|-
!colspan=12 style=| Regular season

|-
!colspan=12 style=|AAC tournament

|-
!colspan=12 style=|NIT

References

Temple Owls men's basketball seasons
Temple
Temple
Temple
Temple